Elister Larry Wilmore (born October 30, 1961) is an American comedian, writer, producer, and actor. He served as the "Senior Black Correspondent" on The Daily Show from 2006 to 2014, and hosted The Nightly Show with Larry Wilmore in 2015 and 2016. He is also the creator of the sitcom The Bernie Mac Show. He served as an executive producer for the ABC television series Black-ish, and is the co-creator, with Issa Rae, of the HBO television series Insecure. Since May 2017, he has hosted a podcast, Black on the Air, where he discusses current events and interviews guests. He is the host of the talk show Wilmore.

Early life
Wilmore was born October 30, 1961, in Los Angeles County, California, to parents Betty and Larry, and grew up in suburban Pomona. His family is from Evanston, Illinois. He was raised Catholic. He is the third of six children. His younger brother Marc was also a television writer, actor, and producer.

As a child, Wilmore found interest in topics such as science, magic, science-fiction and fantasy, all of which have shaped the evolution of his performance. In an interview with NPR, he described himself as a nerd, saying that "it used to be that the black comic figure had to have this bravado and always showed strength...now there's a comic figure where it's OK to just be a nerd and be black."

Wilmore graduated from Damien High School in La Verne, California in 1979. He studied theatre at California State Polytechnic University, Pomona, but dropped out to pursue acting and stand-up comedy.

Career
Beginning in the 1980s, Wilmore appeared in several small film and television roles, including a recurring role as a police officer on The Facts of Life. In the early to mid-1990s, he was on the writing staff of the talk show Into the Night With Rick Dees, the sketch comedy show In Living Color (his younger brother Marc was also a writer with In Living Color; unlike Larry, he became a cast member), and the sitcom Sister, Sister, where he portrayed a bus driver in one episode. He went on to be a writer and producer on a series of black sitcoms, including The Fresh Prince of Bel-Air and The Jamie Foxx Show.

In 1999, Wilmore co-created the animated comedy The PJs with Eddie Murphy and was executive producer until its conclusion in 2001. He subsequently created and produced The Bernie Mac Show, and won an Emmy for writing the pilot episode. He created and produced Whoopi, with Whoopi Goldberg. From 2005 to 2007 he was a consulting producer for The Office, and appeared in the "Diversity Day" episode as Mr. Brown, a diversity consultant.

In 2006, Wilmore began appearing regularly on Comedy Central's The Daily Show, where he was billed as the "Senior Black Correspondent" or a derivative form of the title, such as the "Senior Executive Commander-in-Chief Who Happens To Be Black Correspondent" following the election of Barack Obama. His work on the show frequently centered on humorous observations of the Black experience in American society. In January 2009, Hyperion published Wilmore's I'd Rather We Got Casinos: And Other Black Thoughts, a political humor book described by Booklist as "a faux collection of articles, essays, radio transcripts, and letters exploring the more ludicrous angles on race." Wilmore originated the titular phrase I'd Rather We Got Casinos in a January 2007 Daily Show appearance.

Wilmore has continued occasional acting appearances, including a role as a minister in I Love You, Man (2009) and a supporting role in Dinner for Schmucks (2010).
In 2011, He began a recurring role on the ABC comedy Happy Endings, where he played Mr. Forristal, Brad (Damon Wayans, Jr.)'s uptight boss. Since 2012, he has starred in the Showtime special Race, Religion and Sex, shot in Salt Lake City.

On April 30, 2016, Wilmore was the headliner at the White House Correspondents' Association Dinner. He came under fire for using the word "nigga" to refer to President Obama, saying "Barry, you did it my nigga." He defended his actions by telling Al Sharpton, "I wanted to make a statement more than a joke...I really wanted to explain the historical implications of the Obama presidency from my point of view."

In May 2017, Wilmore started hosting the podcast Larry Wilmore: Black on the Air as part of The Ringer podcast network, headed by Bill Simmons. Time ranked it in the top five of its list of 10 Best podcast of 2017.

The Nightly Show with Larry Wilmore

On January 19, 2015, Wilmore began hosting The Nightly Show with Larry Wilmore, a late-night panel talk show that aired on Comedy Central. It was a spin-off of The Daily Show, and replaced The Colbert Report on the network's 11:30pm timeslot. It was produced by Jon Stewart's production company Busboy Productions. On August 15, 2016, Comedy Central announced that Wilmore's show had been cancelled, and the show ended August 18, 2016 with a total of 259 episodes.

Wilmore
He briefly hosted his own limited series late-night talk show on Peacock titled Wilmore.

Influences
Wilmore has cited Johnny Carson, Richard Pryor, Eddie Murphy and Jon Stewart as comedy influences. He said that when he needs inspiration, he "observe[s] people. I ride the subway, sit in a coffee shop. There’s nothing funnier than real human behavior."

Personal life
Wilmore was married to actress Leilani Jones for 20 years; they have two children, John and Lauren. They divorced in 2015. He resided in San Marino, California with his family until moving to New York City to work on The Nightly Show with Larry Wilmore.

Filmography

Television

As showrunner

As performer

As crew member

Published works

Awards and nominations

References

External links

 
 
 The Larry Wilmore
 Larry Wilmore videos from the Daily Show
 Wilmore Shines as 'Senior Black Correspondent': June 5, 2007, Interview with Terry Gross on Fresh Air on NPR
 
 

1961 births
20th-century American male actors
21st-century American male actors
21st-century American non-fiction writers
African-American Catholics
African-American male actors
African-American television talk show hosts
American television talk show hosts
African-American screenwriters
American male television actors
American media critics
American podcasters
American stand-up comedians
Television producers from California
American television writers
California State Polytechnic University, Pomona alumni
Late night television talk show hosts
Living people
Male actors from Los Angeles
American male television writers
Primetime Emmy Award winners
Comedians from California
People from San Marino, California
Catholics from California
Screenwriters from California
20th-century American comedians
21st-century American comedians
21st-century American screenwriters
21st-century American male writers
20th-century African-American people
21st-century African-American writers